Klára Pollertová (born 17 September 1971 in Prague) is a Czech actress.

Biography
She comes from a sporting and artistic family, her brother Lukáš Pollert, is an Olympic champion from the 1992 Summer Olympic Games in Barcelona.

She made her film debut as a child in 1979 in the eponymous film adaptation of Čapek's Hordubal. In 1983, then appeared in the television series Visitors. In 1989, she played one of the main protagonists in come back into the grave !. Together with her husband, Ivan Trojan, she played his wife in the film One Hand Can not Clap (2003).

After graduating from secondary school she studied acting at the Academy of Performing Arts in Prague, where she earned a MgA. degree, and in the theater began to play in 1994, the Drama Studio in Ústí nad Labem. Since 1995 she has been a member of the Prague Theatre under Palmovkou.

Personal life
Since 1992, her husband is the Czech actor Ivan Trojan, with whom she has four sons Francis (born 1999), Josef (born 2001), Anthony (born 2009) and Vaclav (born 2012).

Filmography
 1979 – The Hordubal (Hafia)
 1980 – The Golden Hen
 1981 – The Owl's Nest (tents)
 1981 – Counting Sheep (girl Hana's bed)
 1983 – Visitors (Ali Lábusová, classmate Adam)
 1983 – Keys to the City (Martina)
 1985 – The Little Village (Majka Pávková)
 1985 – The teeth and hearts (Susan)
 1986 – The operation of my daughter (Milena)
 1989 – Go back to the grave! (Student Eva Malkovich)
 1989 – The Torture of Imagination
 1993 – Mussolini – The Road to Power (Carmen)
 1993 – The Sea is silent (girl)
 1993 – Giovane Mussolini, Il
 1994 – Gracious viewer pardons (Therese – Marie)
 1995 – Your World (student film)
 1995 – The Tale of God's people and pharmacy (Justynka)
 1996 – The Prince boxes (Vítěnka)
 1996 – It is not like a sponge sponge (Berta)
 1996 – As Mr. Pinajs bought from fat cat (Bride)
 1996 – The girl with an uncanny memory (Anabel Frídmanová, rising singing star)
 1997 – Vojtík and spirits (Kunhutina niece Veronica)
 1997 – Dangerous Liaisons (theater recording)
 1997 – Cyprian headless and great-great-grandfather (Kunhutina niece Veronica)
 1999 – Victims: Assault (Hrabánková, Igor's wife)
 2003 – One Hand Can't Clap (Sandra)
 2007 – half-life (Karla)
 2008 – Love is
 2009 – Taste of summer
 2009 – Archive (Křižáková woman in the apartment)
 2012 – CSI Angel – Part Doll (Marta Skálová)
 2012 – In the shadow of (the woman in the ambulance)
 2012 – Smichov crying, Brooklyn sleeping (Jana)
 2012 – Do not Stop (mother Miki)
 2012 – Four Suns (Jerry's mother)

Documentary
 2003 – Night with Angel 
 2011 – 13th Chamber Clara Pollertová-Trojanova

TV
 2012 – Mirror of Your Life
 1983 - Expedition Adam 84

Dubbing
1994 – TV movie The Return of Lew Harper – voicing Melanie Griffith (Schuyler Devereaux)
1998 – The TV movie Only love – [dubbing Hallmark] – Marisa Tomei (Evie)
 1999 – TV film Obsession Ayn Rand – [dubbing Hallmark] – Julie Delpy (Barbara Brandenová)

Theater
 Činoherní klub
 1991 – Utrpení mladého Medarda (Anička)
 1991 – Orestés (Hermiona)
 Narodni theater (Stavovské divadlo)
 1991 – Sbohem, Sókrate (Klára) – vystupovala v alternaci s Barbarou Kodetovou
 DISK Theater
 1992 – Její pastorkyňa (Jenůfa) – divadelní představení na DAMU
 1993 – Kurva svatá (Tonka) – divadelní představení na DAMU
 Činoherní studio Ústí nad Labem
 1993 – Kurva svatá (Tonka) – divadelní představení na DAMU
 1993 – Její pastorkyňa (Jenůfa)
 1993 – Tři mušketýři (D'Artagnanova matka / Ketty)
 1994 – Valašská čtverylka (Votruba)
 1994 – Procitnutí jara (Vendla)
 1994 – Na malém dvorci (Aneta Vaševičová)
 1994 – Romeo a Julie (Julie)
 1995 – Císařův mim (Pamela)
 Palmovkou Theater
 1996–1997 – Život je sen (Rosaura, dáma)
 1996–1999 – Jak se vám líbí (Rosalinda) – vystupovala v alternaci
 1997 – Nebezpečné vztahy (Prezidentová de Tourvel) – vystupovala v alternaci s Miroslavou Pleštilovou
 1997–1999 – Kouzelník z Lublinu (Magda)
 1998–1999 – Pitvora (Beatriz – Juana)
 2001 – Ubohý vrah (Druhá herečka)
 Reznicke Theater
 1997 – Snídaně u Tiffanyho (Holly)
 Svandovo Theater
 2002–2003 – Čas katů (Mme Charpennet / Popravovaná žena)
 2003 – Clavijo (Marie)
 2003–2007 – Poručík z Inishmoru (Maired)
 2003–2008 – Znalci (Kiki)
 2003–2005 – Ženitba (Duňaša)
 2004–2005 – Vášeň jako led aneb Myšlenka pana Doma (Félie, milenka pana Doma)
 2004–2006 – Vojcek - Der Romantiker (Markéta, manželka Profesora)
 2005–2007 – Klářiny vztahy (Klára)
 2005–2010 – Žebrácká opera (Jenny) – vystupovala v alternaci s Janou Strykovou
 2006–2008 – Mobile Horror (Terhi)
 2006–2008 – Periferie (Paní)
 2007 – Bomby, prachy a láska! (Gnazezza Monnezza)
 2008 – Její pastorkyňa (Kolušina)
 2008 – Dorotka (Adéla)
 2008–2009 – Oděsa (Pelegeja, místní kurtizána) – roli později převzala Blanka Popková
 2009 – Kdo je tady ředitel? (Mette) – roli později převzaly Šárka Urbanovská a Blanka Popková
 Viola Theater
 2008 – Noc po rozvodu (Ona)
 Leti Theater
 2009 – Večeře
 Broadway
 Od 2013 – Večírek – vystupuje v alternaci s Miroslavou Pleštilovou

References

External links
 

1971 births
Czech television actresses
Czech film actresses
Czech stage actresses
Living people
21st-century Czech actresses
Actresses from Prague
Academy of Performing Arts in Prague alumni
Czech voice actresses
20th-century Czech actresses